Kevin Mathieu Vinetot (born 14 June 1988) is a French footballer who plays centre-back for Italian  club Südtirol.

Club career
Born in Villiers-le-Bel, suburb of Paris, Vinetot started in the reserve side of  Guingamp. In mid-2008 he moved to Italian side Giulianova, winning the promotion playoffs. In 2009–10 season, he played all 34 league matches and both legs of relegation play-outs.

Crotone
In July 2010 he was transferred to Serie B team Crotone along with Francesco Migliore and Fabio Gubinelli.

Genoa
In June 2011 he was sold to Serie A team Genoa in co-ownership deal, for €1 million (€950,000 cash plus half of Leonardo Terigi) in 4-year contract. The deal made Crotone had a revenue of €2 million in Italian accounting. Vinetot signed a 4-year contract. But on 17 July 2011 he returned to Crotone. His loan and co-ownership was renewed in summer 2012 and in June 2013 for co-ownership only.

Lecce
On 2 August 2013 Vinetot joined Lecce in temporary deal. On 20 June 2014 Vinetot joined Genoa outright, as well as Terigi to Crotone outright.

On 12 August 2014 Vinetot was acquired by Lecce outright, with the residual 50% registration rights of Francesco Todisco went to Genoa.

AlbinoLeffe
In July 2015 he was loaned to AlbinoLeffe. He made 32 appearances in the Lega Pro.

Lecce and Mantova
He returned to Lecce and played three games for the team in the 2016–2017 Lega Pro season before moving to Mantova on loan on 31 January 2017.

Südtirol
On 17 July 2017 he moved to Südtirol on a permanent deal.

Personal life
Vinetot was born in France and is of Guadeloupean descent.

References

External links
 Football.it Profile 
 
 

1988 births
Living people
Footballers from Val-d'Oise
People from Villiers-le-Bel
French footballers
French people of Guadeloupean descent
Association football central defenders
En Avant Guingamp players
Serie B players
Serie C players
Giulianova Calcio players
F.C. Crotone players
U.S. Lecce players
U.C. AlbinoLeffe players
F.C. Südtirol players
French expatriate footballers
French expatriate sportspeople in Italy
Expatriate footballers in Italy